Angélica Lozano Correa (born 7 May 1976) is a Colombian lawyer, politician and LGBTQ+ rights activist. She is the first openly bisexual legislator in the history of Colombia. While in office, she has advocated for various human rights issues. One example is the push for same-sex partnership rights. Colombia legalized same-sex partnerships in 2011, and since her election to the Chamber of Representatives in 2014 Lozano remains outspoken on increasing the rights for same-sex partners. In 2014, Lozano dealt with controversy surrounding her own relationship with a fellow female Senator.

Education 
Lozano received her law degree from the University of La Sabana, located seven miles north of Bogotá in the city of Chía. She also received informal education through the Leadership Program at the National Democratic Institute in 2004. In 2010, Lozano participated in the State Department Fellowship of Local and State level governments.

Political life 
Lozano's interest in politics and human rights issues began while she was a law school. During her studies, in 1998, she volunteered with the NGO Opción Colombia in the Puerto Nariño - Amazonas region. She worked as a legal advisor to the mayor and focused on indigenous protection. She then worked as an advisor to two independent Senators that were on the commission for Constitutional measures, Íngrid Betancourt (from 2000-2001) and Antonio Navarro Wolff (from 2001-2005). In 2003, she co-founded the Independent Democratic Pole party, a left-wing political party. Lozano began her own political career in 2005 when she served as Mayor of the Chapinero district of Bogotá until 2008. Afterwards, in 2011, she was elected to the city council of Bogotá. In 2014 she was elected to the Chamber of Representatives of Colombia as a Green Alliance Party candidate in Bogotá, becoming the country's first out LGBT legislator at the national level.

In 2011, the Colombian Constitutional Court created a ruling that same-sex couples could register their relationship, under the condition that the country’s lawmakers do not pursue a bill that would give same-sex couples the same marriage rights as heterosexual couples. Two years after this ruling, the Colombian Senate rejected legislation that would have given the right to marry to same-sex couples. Lozano stated that she will continue to, “fight to secure the recognition of gay/lesbian families.”

In August 2014, Senator Viviane Morales began to collect signatures in support of a referendum that would make adoptions of children by same-sex couples beholden to a popular vote of six unrelated individuals. Lozano spoke out against this push for legislation, stating that “human dignity and fundamental rights are not decided in a referendum.” Her public opposition to this proposal is another example of her fight for LGBT rights in Colombia.

Other than LGBTQ issues, Lozano has supported many other initiatives during her time in office. These issues include:  increasing the mobility for bicycle use within the city, political reforms to fight corruption in the government, and she is the current spokeswoman of "las veedurías ciudadanas" or the citizen's watchdogs. One project that she focused on throughout 2015 focused primarily on Enrivonmental Policy. The main aim of this law project was to create environmental loyalties that would be able to monetarily compensate municipalities for their conservation and mechanisms for which these loyalties can be monitored.

Activism 
Lozano, who is an out bisexual, is an activist for LGBT rights.  After being elected to the House of Representatives in 2014, Lozano stated that her position shows that the, “fight in the name of equality and respect, justice and the recognition of our rights has been achieved.” Also in May 2014, she took part in a training program in Bogotá backed by USAID that lasted for four days, from May 30 to June 2. Many other Colombian LGBTQ activists attended alongside a number of US representatives. This training was part of USAID’s LGBTI Global Development Partnership, which aims to create a network of LGBT advocacy groups with local businesses. This initiative will invest 11 million dollars in LGBT advocacy groups in various developing countries. The program is designed to last for the next four years.

Controversy 

So far, Lozano's term has not been without controversy. In 2014, Lozano was shown to be in a relationship with a fellow female senator, Claudia López. This relationship sparked a lawsuit from a Colombian senator and Evangelical pastor, Victor Velásquez. He cited Article 179 of the Colombian Constitution which states that two people who are in any form of relationship cannot serve in Congress at the same time. Eventually, the charges were dropped after Lozano and López countered that the stipulation does not apply due to the illegality of marriage equality and civil unions for same-sex couples in Colombia. Lozano and López married in December 2019, following López's election as mayor of Bogota.

References 

1976 births
Living people
Politicians from Bogotá
21st-century Colombian lawyers
Colombian women lawyers
Colombian LGBT rights activists
Colombian LGBT politicians
Colombian bisexual people
Bisexual politicians
Colombian women in politics
Independent Democratic Pole politicians
Mayors of places in Colombia
Women mayors of places in Colombia
LGBT mayors
LGBT legislators
21st-century Colombian LGBT people